Edward Y. Breese (1912-1979) was a popular fiction writer, under the names Brett Halliday, Zane Grey, Ned Buller, Edward Buller or Y.B.

Edward was born in 1912 in Trenton, New Jersey. He graduated from Princeton University in 1934. Later he was an aerial gunner in World War II. After his return from the war he worked at a variety of jobs in Florida and Georgia.

At the age of 40 he began his writing career, concentrating on non-fiction articles in a variety of magazines. In 1966 he began writing and selling fiction stories to pulp magazines such as Ellery Queen's Mystery Magazine, Alfred Hitchcock's Mystery Magazine, Mike Shayne Mystery Magazine, and the Zane Grey Western Magazine.

He died at the age of 67 in Miami, Florida.

Writings 
(from Fiction Mags Index)

 Absolutely, Mr. Marko - Positively, Mr. Smith, (ss) Mike Shayne Mystery Magazine Mar 1968
 Blind Lady Justice, (ss) Mike Shayne Mystery Magazine Feb 1969
 Just Another Perfect Crime, (ss) Mike Shayne Mystery Magazine Apr 1968
 Little Man with the Big Mouth [Johnny Hawk], (nv) Mike Shayne Mystery Magazine Mar 1970
 The Name of the Game Is Murder [as by Brett Halliday; Michael Shayne], (na) Mike Shayne Mystery Magazine Apr 1970
 Pied Piper Calling [Johnny Hawk], (ss) Mike Shayne Mystery Magazine Feb 1972
 Sweet Dreams—of Death [as by Brett Halliday; Michael Shayne], (na) Mike Shayne Mystery Magazine Feb 1972
 Two for One, (ss) Mike Shayne Mystery Magazine Jul 1969

References 

Pulp fiction writers
1912 births
1979 deaths
Writers from Trenton, New Jersey
Princeton University alumni